Bara Kashipur (also called Barakashipur) is the small village located in Balurghat of the Dakshin Dinajpur district of West Bengal in India. Hili (Bangladesh border)  is situated few kilometers from the heart of the village.

Geography

Demographics
In the 2011 census, Bara Kashipur Rural Agglomeration had a population of 926, out of which 82,466 were 450 males and 476 were females. The 0–6 years population was 92. Effective literacy rate for the 7+ population was 67.71 per cent.

Caste Factor: In Bara Kashipur village, most of the village population is from Schedule Tribe (ST). Schedule Tribe (ST) constitutes 38.34% while Schedule Caste (SC) were 4.00% of total population in Bara Kashipur village.

Work Profile: In Bara Kashipur village out of total population, 386 were engaged in work activities. 92.23% of workers describe their work as Main Work (Employment or Earning more than 6 Months) while 7.77% were involved in Marginal activity providing livelihood for less than 6 months. Of 386 workers engaged in Main Work, 138 were cultivators (owner or co-owner) while 168 were Agricultural labourer.

Bara Kashipur Forest
This is a reserve forest which has led to Kashipur forest and it is dense enough compared to other spots of the forest. This is totally a virgin spot.  The ecotourism activities will be projected in this particular spot. It is basically an island in the forest surrounded by the Kashiya creek. It is isolated from the main land.  To protect and save the environment of the forest, picnics should not be allowed in this region.  There are huge varieties of birds both resident and migratory  found  in this area. A project for setting up a deer park in this area had once been started. If this project starts functioning, it will be a great place of tourist attraction. So immediate programmes should be taken up to materialize the project.

Economics
Bara Kashipur is a crop cultivation area of Balurghat distribution centre in northern West Bengal. The main goods traded here include rice, wheat, jute, sugar cane, and oilseeds. Also some amount of jute is grown in the outskirts of the town.

Transportation
Already well-connected by road to Balurghat, Malda, Siliguri, Kolkata, Raiganj and other premier cities in North Bengal. The nearest railway station is Balurghat railway station, as well located on the eastern bank of River Atrayee. The railway line to Balurghat commences at Eklakhi railway station in Maldah district, is now connected to Kolkata via Gour Exp and Tebhaga Exp. The distance between Eklakhi and Balurghat is about 79 km and it crosses two rivers en route - Tangon and Punarbhaba.
Three trains connect Balurghat to Kolkata directly. They are:
1. Gour Express (Departure 5:05pm everyday)
2. Tebhaga Express (Departure 6 am daily except Sunday)
3. Balurghat Howrah bi-weekly Express (Departure 8:30pm every Monday and Tuesday)
One train connect Balurghat to New Jalpaiguri. This is Balurghat-NJP intercity express. One train connects Balurghat to Malda too, Balurghat - Malda Town DEMU Passenger

Education

Schools
The Barakashipur F.P. School is the only primary school located in the heart of the village.

Hospital
There is a small village hospital in the western part of the village.

Festivals

Durga Puja, Kali Puja, Saraswati puja and Biswakarma Puja are widely celebrated at Barakashipur. The Bara Kashipur Durga Puja, arranged by Barakashipur Durga Puja committee is the famous festival and DURGA PUJA MELA in the Dakshin Dinajpur. Rajuah Kali Mela is celebrated at Rajuha, approx 1.5 km from Barakashipur. Bolla Kali Puja is celebrated at Bolla, approximately 6 kilometers from Barakashipur.

References

External links
 

Villages in Dakshin Dinajpur district